Amelita Galli-Curci (18 November 1882 – 26 November 1963) was an Italian coloratura soprano. She was one of the most popular operatic singers of the 20th century, with her recordings selling in large numbers.

Early life
She was born as Amelita Galli into an upper-middle-class Italian family of Spanish heritage in Milan, where she studied piano at the Milan Conservatory, winning a gold medal for piano performance, and at the age of 16 was offered a professorship. She was inspired to sing by her grandmother. Operatic composer Pietro Mascagni also encouraged Galli-Curci's singing ambitions. By her own choice, Galli-Curci's voice was largely self-trained at the beginning of her career. She honed her technique by listening to other sopranos, reading old singing-method books, and doing piano exercises with her voice instead of using a keyboard. She later studied regularly with Estelle Liebling for more than a decade in New York City in the 1920s and 1930s.

Career
Galli-Curci made her operatic debut in 1906 at Trani, as Gilda in Giuseppe Verdi's Rigoletto, and she rapidly became acclaimed throughout Italy for the sweetness and agility of her voice and her captivating musical interpretations. She was seen by many critics as an antidote to the host of squally, verismo-oriented sopranos then populating Italian opera houses.

She toured widely in Europe, Russia and South America. In 1915, she sang two performances of Lucia di Lammermoor with Enrico Caruso in Buenos Aires. These were to be her only operatic appearances with the great tenor, though they later appeared in concert and made a few recordings together. Galli-Curci and Caruso also acted as godparents for the son of the Sicilian tenor Giulio Crimi.

Galli-Curci toured extensively throughout her career, including a 1924 Great Britain concert tour (she never sang in an opera there), where she appeared in 20 cities and a tour of Australia a year later.

United States
Galli-Curci first arrived in the United States in the autumn of 1916 as a virtual unknown. Her stay in the US was intended to be brief, but the acclaim she received for her historic American debut as Gilda in Rigoletto in Chicago, Illinois, on 18 November 1916 (her 34th birthday) was so wildly enthusiastic that she accepted an offer to extend her association with the Chicago Opera Association, where she appeared until the end of the 1924 season. Also in 1916, Galli-Curci signed a recording contract with the Victor Talking Machine Company and made her first records a few weeks before her American debut. She recorded exclusively for Victor until 1930.

On 14 November 1921, while still under contract with the Chicago Opera, Galli-Curci made her debut at the Metropolitan Opera in New York as Violetta in La Traviata, opposite tenor Beniamino Gigli as Alfredo. She was one of the few singers of that era who were contracted to both opera companies simultaneously. Galli-Curci remained at the Met until her retirement from the operatic stage nine years later. 

In 1922, Galli-Curci built an estate in Highmount, New York, which she called "Sul Monte". She summered there for several years until she sold the property in 1937. In the nearby village of Margaretville a theater was erected and named in her honor.  She returned the favor by performing there on its opening night.

Vocal decline and retirement from opera
Weary of opera house politics and convinced that opera was a dying art form, Galli-Curci retired from the operatic stage in 1930 to concentrate instead on concert performances. Throat problems and the uncertain pitching of top notes had plagued her for several years, and she underwent surgery in 1935 for the removal of a thyroid goiter.  Great care was taken during her surgery, which was performed under local anesthesia; however, it was thought her voice suffered following the surgery, specifically, a nerve to her larynx, the external branch of the superior laryngeal nerve, was thought to have been damaged, resulting in the loss of her ability to sing high pitches. This nerve has since become known as the "nerve of Galli-Curci."

In 2001, researchers Crookes and Recaberen "examined contemporary press reviews after surgery, conducted interviews with colleagues and relatives of the surgeon, and compared the career of Galli-Curci with that of other singers" and determined that her vocal decline was most likely not caused by a surgical injury.

Other researchers (Marchese-Ragona et al.) have argued that tracheal compression caused by a goiter put an early end to Galli-Curci's career as a coloratura soprano, but it was nerve damage caused during surgery that prevented her from prolonging her career as lyric or dramatic soprano.

Personal life

In 1908, Amelita Galli wed an Italian nobleman and painter, the Marchese Luigi Curci, attaching his surname to hers. They divorced in 1920.  The Marchese Curci petitioned the papal council in Rome for an annulment of the marriage in 1922. In 1921, Galli-Curci married Homer Samuels, her accompanist. Their marriage lasted until Samuels' death in 1956.

Galli-Curci was a student of the Indian meditation and yoga teacher Paramahansa Yogananda. She wrote the foreword to Yogananda's 1929 book Whispers from Eternity.

Return to opera, death and legacy
On 24 November 1936, Galli-Curci, aged 54, made an ill-advised return to opera, appearing in a single performance as Mimi in La bohème in Chicago. It was painfully clear that her best singing days were behind her and after another year of recitals she went into complete retirement, living in California. She lived in Los Angeles and took up painting. She taught singing privately until shortly before her death from emphysema in La Jolla, California on 26 November 1963, at the age of 81. Among her students was soprano Jean Fenn.

Galli-Curci was a popular recording artist and her voice can still be heard on original 78-rpm records and their LP and CD reissues. Based on her recorded legacy and contemporary assessments of Galli-Curci's performances in England and America, the opera commentator Michael Scott, writing in Volume Two of The Record of Singing (Duckworth, London, 1979), compares her unfavourably as a vocal technician with coloratura sopranos of an earlier generation, such as Nellie Melba and Luisa Tetrazzini, but he acknowledges the unique beauty of her voice and the ongoing lyrical appeal of her charming singing.

Her country estate near Fleischmanns, New York, where she resided from 1922 to 1937, known as Sul Monte, was listed on the National Register of Historic Places in 2010.

Galli-Curci's 1917 recording of Edvard Grieg's Solveig's Song is heard in the Dark Horror, Avoider game 1916 Der Unbekannte Krieg in the Bunker section and is heard at the end of the game.
Galli-Curci is honored on the Hollywood Walk of Fame for recording, with a star located at 6121 Hollywood Boulevard.

In Studio Ghibli's film Grave of the Fireflies, her recording of "Home! Sweet Home!" is played at the end.

In the film Wake in Fright (1971), Galli-Curci's recording of  Caro Nome can be heard playing as 'Doc' Tydon, played by Donald Pleasence remarks "What a doll... Galli-Curci".

Select LP and CD collections

LP:
The Art of Galli-Curci  RCA Camden CAL-410
The Art of Galli-Curci Vol. 2 Bellini/Donizetti RCA Camden CAL-525
Galli-Curci: Golden Age Coloratura RCA Victrola VIC-1518
Golden Age Rigoletto (With Schipa, De Luca, Caruso) RCA Victrola VIC-1633

CD:

Amelita Galli-Curci RCA Victor Vocal Series 61413-2-RG
Amelita Galli-Curci The Complete Acoustic Recordings Volume 1 Romophone 81003-2
Amelita Galli-Curci The Complete Acoustic Recordings Volume 2 Romophone 81004-2
Amelita Galli-Curci The Victor Recordings (1925-28) Romophone 81020-2 
Amelita Galli-Curci The Victor Recordings (1930) Romophone 81021-2

Notes

References 
 Galli-Curci's Life of Song, by C. E. Le Massena, The Paebar Co., New York 1945. ISBN 9780917734007 
 The Last Prima Donnas, by Lanfranco Rasponi, Alfred A Knopf, 1982.

External links 

 Extensive Galli-Curci site with biography, photos, and sound clips
 Amelita Galli-Curci recordings at the Discography of American Historical Recordings.
Galli-Curci Includes one recording
Galli-Curci Ten recordings

1882 births
1963 deaths
Italian operatic sopranos
Singers from Milan
Devotees of Paramahansa Yogananda
Milan Conservatory alumni
People from Shandaken, New York
20th-century Italian women  opera singers
Victor Records artists